The 2015–16 Memphis Tigers women's basketball team will represent the University of Memphis during the 2015–16 NCAA Division I women's basketball season. The season marks the third for the Tigers as members of the American Athletic Conference. The Tigers, led by eighth year head coach Melissa McFerrin, plays their home games at the Elma Roane Fieldhouse. They finished the season 18–13, 12–6 in AAC play to finish in fourth place. They lost in the quarterfinals of the American Athletic women's tournament where they lost to Tulane. They were invited to the Women's National Invitation Tournament where they lost to Tennessee–Martin in the first round.

Media
All Tigers home games will have a radio broadcast live on WUMR. Video streaming for all home games will be available on the Memphis Tiger Network, ESPN3, or AAC Digital. Road games will typically be streamed on the opponents website, though conference road games could also appear on ESPN3 or AAC Digital.

Roster

Schedule and results

|-
!colspan=12 style="background:#0C1C8C; color:#8E9295;"| Exhibition

|-
!colspan=12 style="background:#0C1C8C; color:#8E9295;"| Non-conference regular season

|-
!colspan=12 style="background:#0C1C8C; color:#8E9295;"| AAC regular season

|-
!colspan=12 style="background:#0C1C8C; color:#8E9295;"| American Athletic Conference Women's Tournament

|-
!colspan=12 style="background:#0C1C8C; color:#8E9295;"| WNIT

See also
 2015–16 Memphis Tigers men's basketball team

References

Memphis
Memphis Tigers women's basketball seasons
2016 Women's National Invitation Tournament participants